Inversion Coffee House (also known as Inversion Coffee and Art and Inversion Coffee and Gelato, or simply Inversion) was a coffeehouse in Houston, in the U.S. state of Texas.

Description

Inversion was a coffeehouse on Montrose Boulevard in Houston's Montrose neighborhood, operating in a building owned by Art League Houston. Brittanie Shey of Eater Houston said the cafe was known for its "artsy vibe, creative coffees, and sense of community". Inversion displayed local artwork. Thrillist describes Inversion as an "eclectic Montrose favorite" with free Wi-Fi, La Mexicana breakfast tacos, and a food truck parked outside. The drink menu included salted caramel lattes and frozen chai creams.

History
Inspired by and named after Dan Havel and Dean Ruck's artwork of the same name, Inversion was opened in 2005. The business was popular early on; in 2007, the Houston Press said Inversion was "attracting as much attention as its namesake" and had "just as many Houstonians stopping by for its art as for its killer cup of joe."

The cafe closed on March 26, 2021, ahead of a May 1 lease expiration.

Reception
In 2007, Inversion won in the Best New Coffee House category in the Houston Press annual "Best of Houston" list. The newspaper said: 

Lonely Planet calls Inversion "a great indie coffeehouse" and says, "Even if you're not in Montrose, the casual local vibe, decent baked goods and a rotation of food trucks outside make it worth a detour." Thrillist says, "The recent interior refresh breathes new, airy life into the space, but you'll still find the rockstar beverage lineup that lured you in the first place."

References

External links

 Inversion Coffee House at Zomato

2005 establishments in Texas
2021 disestablishments in Texas
Defunct restaurants in Houston
Neartown, Houston
Restaurants disestablished during the COVID-19 pandemic
Restaurants disestablished in 2021
Restaurants established in 2005